The 1927–28 season was the 53rd season of competitive football in England.

Events
This was the season in which Dixie Dean scored 60 goals in 39 league appearances for Everton – more than half of their total for the season (102).

Honours

Notes = Number in parentheses is the times that club has won that honour. * indicates new record for competition

Football League

First Division

Second Division

Third Division North

Third Division South

Top goalscorers

First Division
Dixie Dean (Everton) – 60 goals

Second Division
Jimmy Cookson (West Bromwich Albion) – 38 goals

Third Division North
Joe Smith (Stockport County) – 38 goals

Third Division South
Harry Morris (Swindon Town) – 38 goals

References